Konstantin Khristov Totev (24 January 1927 – 2006) was a Bulgarian basketball player. He competed in the men's tournament at the 1952 Summer Olympics and the 1956 Summer Olympics.

References

External links

1927 births
2006 deaths
Bulgarian men's basketball players
1959 FIBA World Championship players
Olympic basketball players of Bulgaria
Basketball players at the 1952 Summer Olympics
Basketball players at the 1956 Summer Olympics
People from Veliko Tarnovo
Sportspeople from Veliko Tarnovo Province